The House of Pavle Cincarovski is a historical house in Galičnik that is listed as Cultural heritage of North Macedonia. It is in ownership of one branch of the family of Cincarovski.

Family history

Members of the family 
 Stojan Cincarovski - participant in the Ilinden Uprising. He was killed in 1911 by Albanian bandits in the locality called Pokorita.

References

External links
 National Register of objects that are cultural heritage (List updated to December 31, 2012) (In Macedonian)
 Office for Protection of Cultural Heritage (In Macedonian)

Historic houses
Cultural heritage of North Macedonia
Galičnik